Periyakankanankuppam  is a village in Cuddalore district of the Indian state of Tamil Nadu, India.

Villages in Cuddalore district